The Groupement des écoles d'aéronautique (GEA France) (in English French aeronautical universities network) includes three French national aerospace engineering grandes écoles focused on this scope:
 École nationale de l'aviation civile (ÉNAC), Aix-en-Provence, Carcassonne, Castelnaudary, Toulouse, Muret, Montpellier, Grenoble, Biscarrosse, Château-Arnoux-Saint-Auban, Saint-Yan et Melun,
 École nationale supérieure de mécanique et d'aérotechnique (ISAE-ENSMA), Poitiers,
 Institut Supérieur de l'Aéronautique et de l'Espace (ISAE-SUPAERO), Toulouse.

The Institut sino-européen d'ingénierie de l'aviation of Tianjin 

The Institut sino-européen d'ingénierie de l'aviation (Sino-European Institute of Aviation Engineering) of Tianjin has been created by the GEA grandes écoles, in partnership with DGAC and French companies (EADS, Airbus, Thales, Eurocopter, Safran) as part of a Franco-Chinese cooperation following the implantation of an Airbus A320 assembly plant in Tianjin.
The university opened in October 2007, trains Chinese students. They follow a course in aerospace engineering, taught in French and in six years, a first year of learning the French language, followed by two years of classes préparatoires and three years of aeronautical engineering.

Mastères Spécialisés in Tianjin 

Not linked with the engineering training, three Mastères Spécialisés are taught at the Institut sino-européen d'ingénierie de l'aviation of Tianjin:
 Mastère Spécialisé Aviation Safety management : aeronautical maintenance ;
 Mastère Spécialisé Aviation Safety management : airworthiness ;
 Mastère Spécialisé Aviation Safety management : flight operations.

These courses are for Chinese students who wants to join the aeronautical sector.

References 

Grandes écoles
Technical universities and colleges in France
Engineering universities and colleges in France
Science and technology in France
Multidisciplinary research institutes
Aviation schools
École nationale de l'aviation civile